Williston High School may refer to:

Williston High School (Florida) — Williston, Florida
Williston High School (North Dakota) — Williston, North Dakota
Williston Northampton School — Easthampton, Massachusetts
Williston-Elko High School — Williston, South Carolina
Williston Industrial School — Wilmington, North Carolina